Dominika Kavaschová (born 19 May 1989) is a Slovak actress. At the 2013 DOSKY Awards she was awarded the Discovery of the Year title. At the DOSKY Awards in 2015, she won in the category of Best Actress, for her performances in the play Mojmír II. alebo Súmrak ríše, directed by Rastislav Ballek. Kavaschová has German ancestry.

Selected filmography 
Odsúdené (television, 2010)
Panelák (television, 2010–2013)
Oteckovia (television, 2018–present)

References

External links

1989 births
Living people
Slovak stage actresses
Slovak television actresses
Actors from Košice
21st-century Slovak actresses
Slovak people of German descent